Goodbye blue Monday may refer to:

Breakfast of Champions, or Goodbye Blue Monday, 1973 novel by the American author Kurt Vonnegut
Goodbye Blue Monday (album), 2007 album from Canadian singer-songwriter Jeremy Fisher

 Goodbye Blue Monday, misery punk band from Scotland

See also
Blue Monday (disambiguation)